29th New York Film Critics Circle Awards
January 18, 1964(announced December 30, 1963)

Tom Jones
The 29th New York Film Critics Circle Awards, honored the best filmmaking of 1963.

Winners
Best Film:
Tom Jones
Best Actor:
Albert Finney - Tom Jones
Best Actress:
Patricia Neal - Hud
Best Director:
Tony Richardson - Tom Jones
Best Screenplay:
Irving Ravetch and Harriet Frank, Jr. - Hud
Best Foreign Language Film:
8½ • Italy

References

External links
1963 Awards

1963
New York Film Critics Circle Awards, 1963
New York Film Critics Circle Awards
New York Film Critics Circle Awards
New York Film Critics Circle Awards
New York Film Critics Circle Awards